Up-Park Camp (often Up Park Camp) was the headquarters of the British Army in Jamaica from the late 18th century to independence in 1962.  From that date, it has been the headquarters of the Jamaica Defence Force.  It is located in the heart of Kingston. There is a heliport there which is used by the Jamaica Defence Force.

The mortality rate of British soldiers in Jamaica was very high, particular as a result of yellow fever.  A  estate known as Up Park Pen was purchased by the War Department in 1784, to set up barracks.  However, the mortality rate fell only when many were posted away to a hill station at Newcastle, high in the Blue Mountains.

The camp expanded in the 19th century, and was a base for the West India Regiments.

References

Airports in Jamaica
Military of Jamaica
British Empire
Installations of the British Army
Buildings and structures in Kingston, Jamaica
Military history of Jamaica